The Chinese Professional Baseball League (CPBL) is the top-tier professional baseball league in Taiwan. The league was established in 1989 and played the first season in 1990. CPBL eventually absorbed the competing Taiwan Major League in 2003. As of the 2023 season, the CPBL consists of six organizations, all of which have teams in the main league and farm league.

The CPBL consists of Major and, since 2006, Minor leagues, with the Minor league team rosters consist of developmental and injury-recovering players.

CPBL TV is CPBL's official paid live-streaming and video-on-demand platform. It receives signals from each team's broadcasting partners and is available worldwide.

History
Baseball was first introduced to Taiwan during Japanese rule, and gained popularity when the national little league baseball teams won numerous Little League World Series championships in the 1970s and 1980s. The national baseball team also performed exceptionally well in many international competitions. However, the development of baseball in Taiwan was limited due to the lack of a professional league, and therefore many players were reluctant to commit to the sport.

The idea of forming a professional baseball league in Taiwan was first suggested by local Brother Hotel's chairman Hung Teng-sheng (洪騰勝). He formed his amateur Brother Hotel baseball team in 1984, and intended to professionalize his team and form a professional league within a few years. Throughout 1988 and 1989, Hung visited numerous Taiwanese businesses, trying to convince them to form professional baseball clubs. Most of his requests were rejected, but Wei Chuan Corporation, Mercuries Chain Stores, and Uni-President Corporation all supported the idea and formed teams. The Chinese Professional Baseball League was established on October 23, 1989, with Hung Teng-sheng acting as secretary-general. Because of his contribution to professional baseball in Taiwan, Hung is sometimes referred to as the "Father of the CPBL." Chung Meng-shun (鍾孟舜) designed every original logo of the four founding teams.

Expansions in 1990s
With the popularity rise in the first few years, the Jungo Bears and China Times Eagles joined in 1993. The Koos Group Whales joined in 1997.
The league consisted of seven teams in the 1997 season which is the maximum in CPBL history.

Fixed Game Scandals and decline in popularity
The Black Eagles Incident in 1997 resulted in a major popularity decline. The China Times Eagles became defunct after the 1997 season. The Wei Chuan Dragons and Mercuries Tigers also became defunct after the 1999 season, prior to which the Dragons had won all championships from 1997 to 1999.

Taiwan Major League and merger  with CPBL

In 1997, the newly founded Taiwan Major League began to compete with the CPBL. The two leagues were often competing with each other, but eventually, the TML merged with the CPBL.

Recent expansions
In May 2019, commissioner John Wu announced that CPBL has agreed Ting Hsin International Group to join the league by reactivating a former team, Wei Chuan Dragons. The Dragons participated in the minor league in 2020, and returned to the major league in 2021.

After Tsai Chi-chang became commissioner in 2021, he proposed that Kaohsiung serve as the location for a new team since it was the only major city in Taiwan without a CPBL team at the time. In February 2022, Tsai announced that the sixth team would either be formed by Chunghwa Telecom or Taiwan Steel Group. It was later announced that the expansion team would be by Taiwan Steel Group. The proposed team name is TSG Hawks, and their home field would be Chengcing Lake Stadium in Kaohsiung.

31st Season in 2020
Due to the COVID-19 pandemic, the opening day of the 31st CPBL season on March 14 was delayed. It was originally brought earlier compared to previous seasons to accommodate the final qualifying tournament of 2021 Tokyo Olympics.

On 1 April, the CPBL announced that the season would begin from 11 April as the Rakuten Monkeys hosted the Chinatrust Brothers with the games being playing behind closed doors. This received international coverage because other major baseball leagues such as the MLB in North America, the NPB in Japan, and the KBO in South Korea, which were still severely impacted by the virus outbreak were unable to confirm the dates of their respective season openings. The annual CPBL All-Star Game was cancelled for the first time to accommodate to the compact schedule.

Organizations
All teams are owned by and named after large Taiwanese corporations, a similar practice seen in Japan's NPB and South Korea's KBO. Each team manages a regional market with a home city, but does not play its games exclusively in that market. Other than the home cities, regular season games are also held in Hsinchu, Douliu, Chiayi, Pingtung, Luodong, Hualien, and Taitung with less frequency.

Each season spans from March to October, with a one-week all-star break in June or July, which separates the season into first and second half-seasons. Playoffs are held in late October or early November, with three teams competing in two rounds. A team may qualify for playoffs either by winning a half-season title, or be awarded a wild card berth by attaining the highest place in the seasonal ranks. If a team wins a half-season title, it will not be considered in the seasonal ranks when the winner of the wild card is being decided. If both half seasons were won by the same team, another wild card berth will be given through the same mechanism after the first berth has been awarded

Between 2005 and 2013, the champion team will represent Taiwan in the Asia Series to compete with other champion teams from Nippon Professional Baseball (Japan Series), KBO League (Korean Series), Australian Baseball League (Claxton Shield), and the WBSC Europe (European Champion Cup).

Foreign players
A typical monthly salary for a foreign player is in between 25,000 and 50,000 USD, these positions are normally filled by AA, AAA, or Japanese minor leaguers. The number of foreign players allowed on a team's roster is limited to four. Of the four players only three are allowed to be activated on the major league roster, the remaining foreign player can practice and prepare with the team or play in the minors. A foreign player, once sent to the minor league team, must wait a week before being allowed to be recalled to the major league.

Foreign players, from regions other than Japan and South Korea, are given Chinese epithets to increase familiarity with Taiwanese fans. These epithets, usually two to three characters in length, are generally loose transliterations of the players' names and are generally chosen as terms meant to convey strength or might. One example is Jeff Andra, whose epithet is Feiyong (飛勇) — meaning, literally, a flying brave man. Recently however, most foreign players are just simply given a direct Chinese transcription. Some players (mostly foreign players) have now adopted the custom in the rest of the world by placing their surnames on the back of their jerseys using the Latin alphabet. Some teams now have adopted Latin alphabet jerseys, a trend that has picked up in recent years. The Fubon Guardians only have uniforms with such, and the other teams are adopting such jerseys on occasion.

Current clubs

Defunct clubs 
 China Times Eagles (時報鷹) (1993–1997)
 Chinatrust Whales (中信鯨) (1997–2008)
 Macoto Cobras / dmedia T-REX (米迪亞暴龍) (2003–2008)
 Mercuries Tigers (三商虎) (1990–1999)

Minor League
The CPBL Minor League took shape in late 2003 as a result of cooperation with Chinese Taipei Baseball Association. Alternative service draftees, players deemed eligible to complete their national service obligation in the field of baseball, were sent to the CPBL member organizations to fill their roster. There are currently 6 minor league teams, each plays about 80 games annually. Similar to the NPB's minor leagues, the minor league teams are each owned by CPBL member clubs as reserve teams rather than independent organizations.

League Champions 

Titles by teams as of the end of the 2022 CPBL season:

The Taiwan Series was not held in 1992, 1994 and 1995 because the Brother Elephants and the Uni-President Lions had won the titles by virtue of winning both half-seasons.

All-star game

An all-star game has been held since 1990.

Home Run Derby 

A home run derby has been held since 1992. It is usually held the day before the all-star game.

Awards

Overall
 CPBL MVP of the Year Award
 CPBL Rookie of the Year Award
 CPBL Manager of the Year Award
 CPBL Most Progressive Award

Pitching
 CPBL wins champion
 CPBL ERA champion
 CPBL strikeout champion
 CPBL holds champion
 CPBL saves champion

Batting
 CPBL batting champion
 CPBL home run champion
 CPBL RBI champion
 CPBL hits champion
 CPBL stolen bases champion

Culture

Cheersticks are a pair of plastic sticks, often seen at baseball games in Taiwan. They are banged together to make noise.

Colors of cheersticks in the CPBL
Brother Elephants and CTBC Brothers: Yellow
China Times Eagles: White and black
EDA Rhinos: Purple
First Financial Agan, La New Bears, Lamigo Monkeys and Rakuten Monkeys: Light blue at the beginning, then changed to teal, now black and white.
Fubon Guardians: Aquamarine
Jungo Bears, Sinon Bears and Sinon Bulls: Light green
Koos Group Whales and Chinatrust Whales: Green and white at the beginning, then changed to blue, then all white.
Macoto Gida, Macoto Cobras and dmedia T-REX: Red at the beginning, then changed to orange and black, then red and black.
Mercuries Tigers: Blue
Uni-President Lions and Uni-President 7-Eleven Lions: Green at the beginning, then changed to orange and green, and all orange now.
Wei Chuan Dragons: Red

Colors of cheersticks in the TML
Chianan Luka: Green
Kaoping Fala: Yellow
Taichung Agan: Blue
Taipei Gida: Red

Controversy
Despite its young age, professional baseball in Taiwan had suffered game-fixing scandals several times. Such scandals have led to decline in attendance and also the disbanding of some teams.

The August 3 Incident
The first scandal was the "August 3 Incident", when a group of weapon-carrying local gang members rushed into a Taichung hotel and threatened five Brother Elephants players, including star pitcher , in order for them to cooperate with the gang and fix games for their gambling business on the evening of August 3, 1996. CPBL reported the incident to the police immediately and the gang members were soon arrested, but rumors about game fixing swirled in Taiwan.

The Black Eagles Incident
The rumors came true in January 1997, just before the season started. With solid evidence, police arrested several CPBL players suspected of being in illegal gambling. During the process, many players, mostly from the China Times Eagles, were found to be involved in the game-fixing and were promptly expelled by CPBL. In June 1997, only two Taiwanese players on the roster of the China Times Eagles were not involved in any sort of scandal, and the rest of the league had to lend their players to the Eagles so that they could finish out the season.

The China Times Eagles were eventually disbanded the next season as a result, and attendance declined sharply, from its peak of 6,000 in 1994 to merely 1,500 in 1998. However, the fiasco did not end there. In August 1997, several Mercuries Tigers players were threatened by gambling gangs under similar circumstances as the August 3 Incident. In April 1999, the Wei Chuan Dragons' then manager Hsu Sheng-ming (徐生明) was attacked near his residence in Taipei. The Mercuries Tigers and the Wei Chuan Dragons were also badly affected by the financial loss brought on by the scandal and were disbanded after the 1999 season. The scandal was later nicknamed "The Black Eagles Incident", a reference to the Black Sox Scandal, and also because the China Times Eagles were the most involved in the scandal.

2005 game-fixing scandal
In July 2005, another gambling-related scandal surfaced when the local Next Magazine published a story with photographs of Chinatrust Whales' Australian pitcher Brad Purcell at a Taipei lounge bar along with several local gang members. This article also pointed out several games which may have been fixed between May and June 2005, and listed nearly ten players involved, mostly from foreign countries.

Local prosecutor Hsu Wei-yueh (徐維嶽) took up the case and arrested La New Bears catcher Chen Chao-ying (陳昭穎) and the Macoto Cobras coach Tsai Sheng-fong (蔡生豐) on July 27, both of whom were immediately expelled from the league. However, on August 22, Hsu released the two, stating that "they had made full confessions". Brad Purcell himself had been released earlier by the Chinatrust Whales (and expelled from the league) and fled Taiwan before any trial could start.

Hsu later summoned a total of fifteen players, including the Sinon Bulls American pitcher Jeff Andra, La New Bears Puerto Rican infielder Victor Rodriguez, and Chinatrust Whales Dominican pitcher Emiliano Giron, and claimed that they were involved in gambling. None of the players admitted to being involved in game-fixing but Hsu ruled that the imprisoned players needed bail of NT $100,000 to be released. CPBL immediately expelled the players who were arrested. Only the Brother Elephants and the Uni-President Lions were unaffected by this scandal.

The circumstances of this scandal remain unclear, with the lack of evidence and confessions, and the fact that Hsu Wei-Yueh himself was later arrested for his involvement in bribery scandals, which led to his trial and sentence in 2005.

dmedia T-REX scandal
On October 8, 2008, Banqiao district attorney's office called the owner of dmedia T-REX Shih Chien-hsin, the team's GM, spokesperson, one coach, and three players to the office for allegedly being involved in game-fixing. The three players, Chen Yuen-chia (陳元甲), Chen Ke-fan (陳克帆), and Cory Bailey, were later released after posting bail. In accordance with CPBL policy, the three were immediately expelled and they were banned from playing professionally in the league. Due to the involvement of management/operation personnel in the scandal, the team was expelled from CPBL on October 23, 2008.

The Chinatrust Whales also announced their disbandment on November 11, after playing twelve years in the CPBL. Since then, the league has been reduced to 4 teams until 2021.

2009 game-fixing scandal
The day after the final game of the 2009 Taiwan Series authorities raided the Brother Elephants' dormitory in Taipei and ordered several players to report to the prosecutors' office for questioning regarding game-fixing allegations. In the following weeks, multiple players from the Brother Elephants, Sinon Bulls, and La New Bears were questioned, and some of them were arrested and eventually charged. Furthermore, Elephants manager Shin Nakagomi was also charged and later pled guilty in exchange for being released and allowed to return to Japan. Some of the convicted players were given prison sentences ranging from one to four years.

Naming issue

The name "Chinese Professional Baseball League" has attracted controversy. Owing to the ambiguous political status of Taiwan and the Nagoya Resolution, the Republic of China was forced to use the name of "Chinese Taipei" under pressure from the People's Republic of China under the One China policy. Many have called to for the name of CPBL be changed, with suggestions including the replacement of “Chinese” with “Taiwan” or “Formosa” the most popular, while some proposed using “Chunghwa”.

See also

Asia Series
Chinese Taipei national baseball team
Gambling in Taiwan
List of professional baseball leagues
List of the nicknames used in the CPBL
Professional baseball in Taiwan
Sport in Taiwan

References

External links
 Chinese Professional Baseball League 
 History of the Chinese Professional Baseball League 
 Taiwanese Baseball Primer 

 
Baseball leagues in Taiwan
Sports leagues established in 1989
1989 establishments in Taiwan
Professional sports leagues in Taiwan